This is a list of episodes of the fifth season of The Ellen DeGeneres Show, which aired from September 2007 to June 2008.

Episodes

Notes

References

External links
 

5
2007 American television seasons
2008 American television seasons